Walckenaeria vigilax is a spider species with Holarctic distribution. It is considered new to the fauna of Latvia since 2009.

See also 
 List of Linyphiidae species (Q–Z)

References

External links 

Linyphiidae
Spiders of Europe
Spiders described in 1853
Holarctic spiders